Amorbia cuneanum, the western avocado leafroller moth, is a species of moth of the family Tortricidae. It is found from Baja California, Mexico, to south-western Canada. To the east, the range extends to Arizona and Idaho in the United States.

The length of the forewings is 11.5–13 mm for males and 12–14.5 mm for females. The ground colour of the forewings is straw yellow, with an oblique darker mark. The hindwings are beige with a darker patch at the apex. Adults are on wing year round in two generations per year.

The larvae feed on Abies concolor, Rhus laurina, Arctostaphylos insularis, Arcotostaphylos patula, Persea americana, Laurus species, Ceanothus arboreus, Heteromeles arbutifolia, Lyonothamnus floribundus, Prunus species (including Prunus lyonii), Citrus species and Salix species. Full-grown larvae reach a length of about 25 mm.

References

Moths described in 1879
Sparganothini
Moths of North America